Antonio Langella (born 30 March 1977) is an Italian footballer who played as a forward or winger on either flank.

Club career
After playing for a number of lower-rank Sardinian clubs in the beginning of his career, Langella joined Cagliari Calcio in March 2002, then in Serie B. With this team, he made his Serie A debut on 12 September 2004, against Bologna.
In December 2004, his contract with Cagliari was renewed until 2008. However, he made just 16 goalless appearances in 2006–07, subsequently moving to Atalanta on 10 July 2007.

In 2008, he joined Udinese on reported free transfer, being however immediately loaned out to Chievo, where he failed to impress throughout the season. During the 2009 summer transfer window, he left Udinese to join newly promoted Serie A outfit Bari in 3-year deal. He only played 9 Serie A games in the first season. In the next two seasons, he was left out of the first team by coach Gian Piero Ventura, and failed to make any appearances. In September 2011, he terminated his contract with Bari, and subsequently retired from professional football.

International career
Langella made three appearances for the Italian national team under Marcello Lippi, all in 2005. He made his senior international debut on 9 February, in a 2–0 friendly home win over Russia, and later appeared in a 0–0 friendly home draw against Iceland on 30 March, and in a 1–1 friendly draw against Ecuador, in New York on 11 June, which was his final appearance for Italy.

Career statistics

International

Honours

Club 
Sassari Torres
Serie D: 1999–00

References

External links
NFT profile
Gazzetta dello Sport profile 
AIC profile 
FIGC profile 

1977 births
Living people
Italian footballers
Italy international footballers
Cagliari Calcio players
Atalanta B.C. players
A.C. ChievoVerona players
S.S.C. Bari players
Serie A players
Serie B players
Association football forwards
Footballers from Naples
S.E.F. Torres 1903 players